Moose Tracks is a branded flavor of ice cream owned and licensed by Denali Flavors Inc. that is manufactured by different companies under various brands. The Original Moose Tracks product description is as follows, "vanilla ice cream with peanut butter cups and famous Moose Tracks fudge". 

There are many iterations of Moose Tracks, including chocolate, mint, and brownie. Light varieties of the ice cream are produced, which have fewer calories compared to full-calorie versions. Additionally, a frozen yogurt variety is produced. The brand's mascot is the Moose Tracks moose.

The first scoop of Moose Tracks was tasted in July 1988. The name “Moose Tracks” came from a mini golf course in Marquette, Michigan located in the Upper Peninsula of Michigan, which was right down the street from  Jilbert's Dairy, the first ice cream shop to carry Original Moose Tracks.

Brands 
Many different brands license the Moose Tracks flavor including Strohs,  Belmont (ALDI), Market Pantry (Target), Private Selection (Kroger Co.), Dean's, Signature Select (Safeway/Albertsons), Mayfield, Kawartha Dairy Company, and Publix.

Variations 
In addition to the Original Moose Tracks flavor, there are over  a dozen other varieties of Moose Tracks:
 Chocolate Moose Tracks
 Caramel Brownie Moose Tracks
 Mint Moose Tracks
 Extreme! Maximum Fudge Moose Tracks
 Brownie Moose Tracks
 Peppermint Bark Moose Tracks
 Black Raspberry Moose Tracks
 Cherry Moose Tracks
 Maximum Fudge Moose Tracks
 Extreme! Moose Tracks
 Original Moose Tracks No Sugar Added
 Glacier Mint Moose Tracks
 Chocolate Peanut Butter Moose Tracks
Denali Flavors also licenses several other flavors:
 Caramel Caribou
 Salty Caramel Caribou
 Bear Claw
 Bear Foot Brownie
 Kodiak Island Fudge
 Otter Paws

Snack mix
Denali Flavors and Georgia Nut Company in Skokie, Illinois collaborated to create a trail mix brand based upon the Moose Tracks flavor.  Moose Tracks Snack mix is available at Walgreens in the Nice! brand.

See also

 List of ice cream flavors

References

Further reading

External links 
 

Flavors of ice cream